Silurus biwaensis, the giant Lake Biwa catfish or Biwako-o'namazu (ビワコオオナマズ (Japan)), is a large predatory catfish species endemic to Lake Biwa in Japan.

Description
The giant Lake Biwa catfish is very similar to wels catfish, which it is closely related to. The top of the body is dark grey to black in colour while the underside is a pale, whitish colour.

Lifecycle
They prey on fish and frogs which live in the lake. S. biwaensis is the largest predatory fish in Lake Biwa. Using telemetry methods researchers tried to explain the migratory behavior of the species. It was found that the fish are more or less site-faithful and mostly stay close to their spawning grounds. Other studies have shown that the sub-populations of the lake hardly mix.

Relationship to humans
Some fishermen believe that the catfish change their behavior and become very active when an earthquake is imminent. In Japanese mythology, a giant catfish named Namazu causes earthquakes as he moves below the earth's surface.

References

biwaensis
Freshwater fish of Japan
Endemic fauna of Japan
Fish described in 1961